From January 19 to June 8, 2004, voters of the Republican Party chose its nominee for president in the 2004 United States presidential election. Incumbent President George W. Bush was again selected as the nominee through a series of primary elections and caucuses culminating in the 2004 Republican National Convention held from August 30 to September 2, 2004, in New York City.

Primary race overview 
Incumbent President George W. Bush announced in mid-2003 that he would campaign for re-election; he faced no major challengers. He then went on, throughout early 2004, to win every nomination contest, including a sweep of Super Tuesday, beating back the vacuum of challengers and maintaining the recent tradition of an easy primary for incumbent Presidents (the last time an incumbent was seriously challenged in a presidential primary contest was when Senator Ted Kennedy challenged Jimmy Carter for the Democratic nomination in 1980). Bush managed to raise US$130 million in 2003 alone, and expected to set a national primary fund-raising record of $200 million by the time of the 2004 Republican National Convention in New York City.

Several states and territories canceled their respective Republican primaries altogether, citing Bush being the only candidate to qualify on their respective ballot, including Connecticut, Florida, Mississippi, New York, Puerto Rico, and South Dakota.

Senator Lincoln Chafee of Rhode Island, an opponent of the war in Iraq, Bush's tax cuts, drilling in the Arctic National Wildlife Refuge, and much of Bush's social agenda, considered challenging Bush in the New Hampshire primary in the fall of 2003. He decided not to run, after the capture of Saddam Hussein in December 2003. He would later change his party affiliation to Democratic and run in that party's 2016 presidential primaries.

Candidates

Nominee

Challengers

On the ballot in two or more primaries 
 William Tsangares ran for president under the pseudonym "Bill Wyatt." The then-43-year-old T-shirt maker left the Democratic Party to become a Republican after Democrats voted for the war in Iraq, an action he saw as a betrayal. Tsangares traveled 12,000 miles and spent an estimated $20,000 on his Presidential campaign. He managed to get on the ballot in New Hampshire, Missouri, Oklahoma, and Louisiana, and even the Democratic Primary ballot in Arizona. He finished tenth in the New Hampshire primary with 0.23% of the vote (153 votes), placed second in Missouri, where he received 1,268 votes (1.03%). However, a minor upset occurred on Mini-Tuesday when Tsangares won just over 10% of the vote in Oklahoma and 4% in Louisiana. He also received 233 votes (0.10%) in the Arizona Democratic primary.

 Blake Ashby, a Republican entrepreneur frustrated with the explosion of debt under President Bush, ran as a protest candidate in the Republican primaries. On the ballot in New Hampshire and Missouri, he spent approximately $20,000 on his campaign, visiting New Hampshire and campaigning in his home state of Missouri and participated in the C-Span Minor Candidates Forum  He finished seventh in New Hampshire with 264 votes  and third in Missouri with 981 votes.

On the ballot in one primary 
All but one of the following were on the ballot only in the state of New Hampshire.

Declined to be candidates

Results 
There were 2,509 total delegates to the 2004 Republican National Convention, of which 650 were so-called "superdelegates" who were not bound by any particular state's primary or caucus votes and could change their votes at any time. A candidate needs 1,255 delegates to become the nominee. Except for the Northern Mariana Islands and Midway Atoll, all states, territories, and other inhabited areas of the United States offer delegates to the 2004 Republican National Convention.

Counties carried

See also 
 2004 Democratic Party presidential primaries

References

Notes